David Powell (born 15 October 1944) is a Welsh former footballer who played as a defender. Born in Dolgarrog, Wales he played for Wrexham, Sheffield United and Cardiff City before being forced to retire through injury. He also represented Wales at full international level, winning eleven caps.

Career

Club career
Having played with local side Gwydir Rovers as a youth, Powell was taken on as an apprentice by Wrexham in January 1962 where he worked as a member of the ground staff. By May 1968 he had graduated to the first team and was handed his first professional contract, going on to make 134 appearances for the Welsh club.

Powell was signed by Sheffield United in September 1968 for a fee of £28,500. He became a regular in United's defence for the following three seasons, being voted the club's Player of the Year in 1969, and was an integral part of the side that gained promotion to the English top-flight in 1971. Unfortunately for Powell he badly injured his knee during a game at Queens Park Rangers towards the end of that season and remained sidelined for over a year.

Powell was eventually released by United in September 1972 to allow him to return to Wales and join Cardiff City. He played for a further two seasons, making 36 league appearances for the Bluebirds before retiring through injury. The highlights of his City career came as the side won the 1973 Welsh Cup and subsequently gained entry into the European Cup Winners' Cup where they lost out to Ferencvaros.

International career
Powell made his debut for Wales U23's in October 1966, in an 8–0 loss to England. After a further three appearances for the U23s he graduated to the full senior squad and gained his first cap on 8 May 1968 in a 1–1 draw with West Germany. Powell played eleven games for Wales in total, scoring once in October 1969 during a 1–3 loss to East Germany.

International goals

Personal life
Following his retirement from football, Powell took a job with the South Wales Police, working at their training centre in Bridgend and coaching their football team. Following his retirement from the police Powell settled in the Cardiff area.

Honours
Wrexham
Welsh Cup: Runners up – 1965
Sheffield United
Second Division: Runners up – 1971
Cardiff City
Welsh Cup: Winners – 1973

References

1944 births
Living people
Sportspeople from Conwy County Borough
Welsh footballers
Wales international footballers
Wales under-23 international footballers
English Football League players
Association football defenders
Wrexham A.F.C. players
Sheffield United F.C. players
Cardiff City F.C. players